Saint-Eusèbe is a parish municipality in Quebec, Canada.  It was established in 1911.

Demographics 

See also
Branche à Jerry, a stream
List of parish municipalities in Quebec

References

External links

Parish municipalities in Quebec
Incorporated places in Bas-Saint-Laurent